Patrick Kemper (Ciudad del Este, March 29, 1981) is a Paraguayan businessman and politician, founder of Hagamos Political Party (Partido Político Hagamos) and its current president. He is currently a senator of Paraguay since 2018.

Biography 
Patrick Kemper was born in Paraguay (Ciudad del Este, Alto Paraná) and he is married and father of 4 children. He was an entrepreneur and worked in the private sector until election to the Senate of Paraguay.

In high school he was elected president of his class at the Goethe School, and later during his university studies he was first elected treasurer and a year later elected vice-president of the Student Government at the American University, culminating his studies at the aforementioned university, obtaining a degree in Business Administration and Management.

He also completed a Master's Degree in Financial Management at the University of Barcelona / EAE Business School, a Master's Degree in Strategic Governance and Political Communication at the George Washington University in Washington, DC He also completed the "Public Narrative: Leadership, Storytelling, and Action Program" in 2020, "Negotiation Strategies: Building Agreements Across Boundaries Program" in 2021 and "Senior Manager in Government" in 2022 at the John F. Kennedy School of Government at Harvard University, obtaining the "Executive Certificate in Public Leadership" awarded by the Harvard Kennedy School.

Political career 
He was appointed advisor to the Municipal Board of Asuncion, Paraguay.

He is the founder of the Hagamos political party and is currently its president, having been elected as candidate for senator of the nation at the age of 36 in the Primary elections of the mentioned party, assuming the position at the age of 37.

Commissions he has been part of

2018-2019 Period 
Vice leader of the Hagamos Party faction, President of the Senate Economy, Cooperativism and Latin American Economic Integration Committee, Vice President of the Senate Committee on Open Parliament, member of the Senate Committee on Constitutional Affairs, National Defense and Public Force and also a member of the Senate Legislation, Codification, Justice and Labor Committee.

2019-2020 Period 
Leader of the Hagamos Party faction, President of the Senate Economy, Cooperativism and Latin American Economic Integration Committee, member of the Constitutional Affairs, National Defense and Public Force Committee and also member of the Senate Legislation, Codification, Justice and Labor Committee and Vice President of the bicameral committee on the reorganization of the structure of the state.

2020-2021 Period 
Leader of the Hagamos Party faction, President of the Industry, Commerce and Tourism Commission, Vice President of the Economy, Cooperativism, Development and Latin American Economic Integration Commission, Vice President of the Bicameral Commission of Social Economy, Vice President of the Petitions, Powers and Regulations Commission, member of the Legislation, Codification, Justice and Labor Commission, member of the Social Development Commission, member of the Bicameral Budget Commission.

2021-2022 Period 
Leader of the Hagamos Party faction, President of the Industry, Commerce and Tourism Commission, Vice President of the Bicameral Commission of Social Economy, and of the Special Commission for the Follow-up of the fight against contraband of industrialized and fruit and vegetable products, member of the Commission of Social Development, of the Bicameral Commission of Budget, of the Commission of Finance and Budget, and of the Commission of Foreign Affairs and International Affairs.

2022-2023 Period 
Leader of the Hagamos Party faction, President of the Industry, Commerce and Tourism Commission, Vice President of the Bicameral Commission of Social Economy, member of the Social Development Committee, of the Bicameral Budget Committee, of the Finance and Budget Committee, of the Legislation, Codification, Justice and Labor Committee, of the Petitions, Powers and Regulations Committee and member of the Parliamentary Front for the Support of National Production.

Special Commissions and Appointments
He is also a member of parliamentary committees of friendship with countries such as: USA, Germany, Qatar, Costa Rica, Turkey and the Bicameral Commission of Economy of the Republic of Paraguay.

Member of the Permanent Commission of the Latin American Parliament (Parlatino) created by the Treaty of Institutionalization of the Latin American Parliament of July 17, 1993 and Counselor representative of Open Parliament in Parlaméricas.

Representative Counselor of Open Parliament in Parlaméricas. He is also a member of the Board of Directors of the Forum of Young Parliamentarians of the Inter-Parliamentary Union (IPU).

References

External links 

 Perfil legislativo de Patrick Kemper

Members of the Senate of Paraguay
Paraguayan businesspeople

1981 births
Living people
21st-century Paraguayan politicians
People from Ciudad del Este
Political party founders
University of Barcelona alumni
American University alumni